San Marone is a church in Rome located in the Ludovisi rione and dedicated to Saint Maron, a 5th-century Syrian hermit who founded the Maronite Church. It is the national church of the Lebanese maronite community in the city, with services following the Antiochian Rite in Arabic. The church was built in 1890 based on a design by Andrea Busiri Vici, to serve the neighbouring maronite monastery that, in 1936, was turned into an hotel.

References

Sources 
  C. Rendina, Le Chiese di Roma, Newton & Compton Editori, Milano 2000, p. 260-261
  G. Carpaneto, Rione XVI Ludovisi, in AA.VV, I rioni di Roma, Newton & Compton Editori, Milano 2000, Vol. III, pp. 1015-1037

External links 
  Official Website

Roman Catholic churches in Rome
National churches in Rome
19th-century Roman Catholic church buildings in Italy
Churches of Rome (rione Ludovisi)